When It Rains may refer to:

Music
When It Rains, an album by Silent Screams, or the title song, 2011
"When It Rains" (Brad Mehldau song), 2002
"When It Rains" (Eli Young Band song), 2007
"When It Rains", a song by Paramore from Riot!, 2007

Television and film
"When It Rains…", an episode of Star Trek: Deep Space Nine
"When It Rains" (Steven Universe), a television episode
When It Rains, a 1995 short film directed by Charles Burnett

See also
"When It Rain", a 2016 song by Danny Brown
When It Rains, It Pours (disambiguation)